Air Wisconsin Airlines is a regional airline based at Appleton International Airport in the town of Greenville, Wisconsin, near Appleton. Air Wisconsin originally operated as one of the original United Express partners in 1985, and operated then as US Airways Express on behalf of US Airways prior to becoming an American Eagle regional air carrier. Since March 2018, Air Wisconsin operates exclusively as a United Express regional air carrier once again with primary hubs located at Chicago's O'Hare International Airport (ORD) and Washington Dulles International Airport (IAD). This will come to an end in April  2023 as the carrier switches to conducting American Eagle branded flights, per a new contract with American Airlines.

History 

In 1963 investors from the Fox Cities raised $110,000 to start a new airline. The airline was established as an independent commuter air carrier in 1965 and started operations on August 23, 1965, just one day after the brand new Outagamie County Regional Airport was opened using de Havilland Dove commuter aircraft configured with nine passenger seats. It was founded to connect Appleton with Chicago and initially had 17 employees and two de Havilland Dove aircraft. According to the August 23, 1965 Air Wisconsin timetable, the airline was flying one route between Appleton and Chicago–O'Hare with four round trips on weekdays and two round trips on Saturdays and Sundays operated with the British-manufactured Dove twin prop aircraft.

By the mid 1970s, Air Wisconsin was flying two small commuter turboprop airliner types, being the de Havilland Canada DHC-6 Twin Otter and Swearingen Metro, and was operating a small hub at Chicago's O'Hare Airport with service primarily to destinations in Indiana, Michigan, and Wisconsin as well as to Minneapolis/Saint Paul from several small cities in Wisconsin.

In September 1978 the airline was certified by the Civil Aeronautics Board (CAB) as a regional air carrier (Air Wisconsin previously had commuter air carrier status with the CAB). In October 1978 it had over $10 million in assets. Joining Air Wisconsin in 1965 as traffic manager and eventually becoming president, Preston H. Wilbourne's leadership oversaw Air Wisconsin grow to an airline serving 29 cities in an eleven state area with 32 aircraft boarding over 10,000 passengers daily. Air Wisconsin gained the nicknames "Air Willy" and "Rag Tag" and more recently "Air Wis" and "Air Wisky".

By 1985, Air Wisconsin had become a large independent regional air carrier operating British Aerospace BAe 146-200 and British Aircraft Corporation BAC One-Eleven jets as well as de Havilland Canada Dash 7 turboprops with flights as far west as Grand Island, Nebraska, and Minneapolis/Saint Paul, and as far east as Bridgeport and New Haven, Connecticut, with a large connecting hub located at Chicago's O'Hare Airport (ORD). By early 1986, the airline was serving sixteen airports with its British-manufactured jets with flights to Appleton, Bridgeport, Cedar Rapids, Iowa, Chicago–O'Hare, Flint, Michigan, Fort Wayne, Indiana, Grand Island, Green Bay, Wisconsin, Kalamazoo, Michigan, Lincoln, Nebraska, Moline, Illinois/Quad Cities, New Haven, South Bend, Indiana, Toledo, Ohio, Waterloo, Iowa, and Wausau/Stevens Point, Wisconsin, with other flights and destinations in its route system being served with the Canadian-manufactured four engine Dash 7 turboprop.

Air Wisconsin pioneered the concept of code sharing on behalf of United Airlines when the carrier began operating as United Express on May 1, 1985. As an independent air carrier prior to its business agreement with United to provide passenger feed, Air Wisconsin rapidly became the nation's largest regional airline in the 1980s. On May 17, 1985, it merged with Mississippi Valley Airlines (MVA) and continued to fly as United Express, operated by Air Wisconsin.

By late 1989 Air Wisconsin was operating United Express code share service from two United hubs: Chicago–O'Hare (ORD) and Washington–Dulles (IAD). According to the Official Airline Guide (OAG) at this time, United Express flights were operated with BAe 146-200 jets and Fokker F27 turboprops nonstop to Chicago–O'Hare from Akron/Canton, Ohio, Appleton, Cedar Rapids, Champaign, Illinois, Fort Wayne, Green Bay, Kalamazoo, La Crosse, Wisconsin, Lansing, Michigan, Lexington, Kentucky, Moline/Quad Cities, Oshkosh, Wisconsin, Peoria, Illinois, Roanoke, Virginia, South Bend, Toledo, and Wausau, and with BAe 146-200 jets and Short 360 turboprops nonstop to Washington Dulles from Charleston, West Virginia, Charlottesville, Virginia, and Richmond, Virginia, as well as Harrisburg, Reading, and State College, Pennsylvania.

In 1990 Air Wisconsin acquired Denver-based Aspen Airways and was itself bought by United Airlines a year later.

During the 1990s, Air Wisconsin operated British Aerospace (BAe) ATP turboprop aircraft as well as BAe 146-100, BAe 146-200, and BAe 146-300 jet aircraft on United Express services. These were all large aircraft types when compared to other regional aircraft in operation at the time. Air Wisconsin was the only U.S. operator of the BAe ATP turboprop and also the BAe 146–300, which is the largest member of the BAe 146 family of jet aircraft. United Airlines sold Air Wisconsin and the BAe 146 fleet to CJT Holdings in 1993. Air Wisconsin was then renamed Air Wisconsin Airlines Corporation (AWAC) as UAL retained the rights to the Air Wisconsin name and logo. During the ski seasons, Air Wisconsin was operating British Aerospace BAe 146 jet shuttle service as United Express on the former Aspen Airways route between Aspen, Colorado, and Denver with at least fourteen daily nonstop flights in each direction.

In February 1998 AWAC acquired the assets of Mountain Air Express including Dornier 328 turboprop aircraft which were used to expand United Express service in the west. In the fall of 2003 AWAC acquired ten Bombardier CRJ regional jet aircraft from bankrupt Midway Airlines and became a feeder for AirTran Airways under the name AirTran JetConnect, but this relationship was discontinued in July 2004. Towards the end of the contract with United Airlines Air Wisconsin was unable to secure a long-term deal or extension to continue providing regional service for UAL. United failed to renew its contract with AWAC, allowing it to expire in April 2005, and the last flight under the United flag operated on April 16, 2006, using the BAe 146.

During 2005 AWAC invested $175 million U.S. into US Airways for their bankruptcy exit financing in exchange for a long-term contract operating as US Airways Express. In 2005 AWAC began operating all of its CRJ-200 regional jets as a US Airways Express carrier with flight crew bases located in Philadelphia, New York LaGuardia, Washington Reagan National, and Norfolk, Virginia. US Airways has since merged with American Airlines and Air Wisconsin operated as an American Eagle regional air carrier via a code sharing agreement with American until March 2018.

On November 20, 2014, it was reported that Air Wisconsin was nearing an agreement with Delta Air Lines to fly as a Delta Connection carrier beginning in January 2015. Under the terms of the deal, 26 CRJ-200 aircraft were to be transferred to Air Wisconsin from Endeavor Air. In January 2015, Air Wisconsin said that negotiations had ended and that it did not want to fly under the Delta Connection brand.

In 2016, it was announced that Air Wisconsin would close all of its ground handling operations in all cities served by the air carrier primarily due to the formation of a wholly-owned subsidiary of United called United Ground Express. This would leave only three American Eagle ground handling cities served, which the airline deemed uneconomical.

On March 1, 2017, Air Wisconsin announced a new agreement with United Airlines to once again operate under the United Express banner upon the expiration of the airline's current agreement with American Eagle in 2018. Additionally, the new agreement with United would provide for the creation of a career pathway program whereby Air Wisconsin pilots would be offered the opportunity to move up to United upon meeting its hiring standards.

In September 2021, the company announced that they had signed a lease for at least 1 Bombardier CRJ200SF (converted cargo aircraft) set to enter service from December 2021.

On 22 August 2022, Air Wisconsin announced a five year contract to operate up to 60 of the American Eagle CRJ-200s, starting in March 2023. These aircraft will be based at Chicago-O'Hare, to fill in for the Envoy Air Embraer E145s that will be transferred over to Piedmont Airlines. The airline also plans to utilize some CRJ-700s. This will also be ending their partnership with United Airlines.

Destinations 

Air Wisconsin operating as United Express currently serves 75 destinations with nearly 350 flights per day, transporting nearly six million passengers on an annual basis.

Crew domiciles 
Operating as United Express, Air Wisconsin pilots and flight attendants have crew domiciles at the following locations:

 Chicago, Illinois – O'Hare International Airport (ORD)
 Milwaukee, Wisconsin – Milwaukee Mitchell International Airport (MKE)
 Washington, D.C. / Dulles, Virginia – Dulles International Airport (IAD)
 Dayton International Airport (DAY)

Fleet 
The Air Wisconsin fleet comprises the following aircraft (as of October 2021):

Historical fleet 
In 2016, the airline retired four CRJ-200 regional jets that had met their structural time limit and sent them to Tupelo Regional Airport (TUP) in Tupelo, Mississippi.

The following aircraft types were formerly operated by Air Wisconsin:

Jet aircraft 

 BAe 146-100 (via acquisition of Aspen Airways)
 BAe 146-200
 BAe 146-300 (only U.S. operator of the BAe 146-300)
 BAC One-Eleven

Turboprop aircraft 

 Beechcraft Model 99
 British Aerospace ATP
 de Havilland Canada Dash 6
 de Havilland Canada Dash 7
 de Havilland Canada Dash 8-100
 de Havilland Canada Dash 8-300
 Dornier 328 (via acquisition of Mountain Air Express)
 Fokker F27
 Short 360 (via merger with Mississippi Valley Airlines)
 Short 330 (via merger with Mississippi Valley Airlines)
 Swearingen Metro

Piston aircraft 

 de Havilland Dove

Aircraft maintenance 
Air Wisconsin performs CRJ maintenance activities at the following locations:
 Appleton, Wisconsin (Appleton International Airport)
 Milwaukee, Wisconsin (Milwaukee Mitchell International Airport)
 Dayton, Ohio (Dayton International Airport)

Air Wisconsin also contracts aircraft maintenance-heavy checks at a facility in Oklahoma City, Oklahoma (OKC).

Past heavy check maintenance was conducted in Montreal, Canada, and Hot Springs, Arkansas (HOT).

Air Wisconsin's primary aircraft painting is located in Fort Worth, Texas – Meacham International (FTW).

Incidents and accidents

See also 
 Air transportation in the United States
 List of airports in Wisconsin

References

External links 

 
Appleton, Wisconsin
Outagamie County, Wisconsin
Airlines based in Wisconsin
Economy of the Eastern United States
Airlines established in 1965
Regional Airline Association members
1965 establishments in Wisconsin